The Al Watania Poultry Institute of Technology is established as a result of strategic partnership of Technical and Vocational Training Corporation and Al-Watania Poultry Co. in Saudi Arabia. This is a non-profit institute developed in kingdom to promote the technical education in the field of poultry production and support services.

This is sole initiative of Al-Watania Poultry Co. to establish this institute. Al-Watania Poultry is one of the largest companies in the world producing poultry meat and its products, and is located 25 kilometers north of Buraidah in Al-Qassim Region.

The institute offers the following programs:

 Full diploma in poultry production
 Associate diploma in poultry production
 Short courses in different poultry related fields

2014 establishments in Saudi Arabia
Government agencies established in 2014
Educational organisations based in Saudi Arabia
Government agencies of Saudi Arabia
Poultry research institutes
Agricultural organisations based in Saudi Arabia
Research institutes in Saudi Arabia